The Vista Spirit hybrid-class cruise ship is the culmination of two cruise ship designs. The Italian shipbuilder Fincantieri constructed Vista-class ships for Holland America and P&O Cruises and the Finnish STX shipbuilder built Spirit-class vessels for the Carnival and Costa brands.

Background

The visual differences between the ships include:

 Vista-class ships had an external observation lift mid-ship on both sides of the ship, a wider forward and aft deck-width and a tiered forward section on the passenger cabin decks. Vista-class vessels also tend to have an additional upper deck just forward of the funnel.
 Spirit-class ships have an alternate wide-narrow-wide-narrow-wide deck width along their length and a flat forward section leading to the bow of the ship with small windows

Hybrid design
The hybrid design was first launched as Queen Victoria in 2007.  

The hull, bow, and stern of the Vista Spirit hybrid class are identical; except for Queen Victoria which differs in some details.

Ships in class 

Cruise ship classes
Fincantieri